M82 X-2 is an X-ray pulsar located in the galaxy Messier 82, approximately 12 million light-years from Earth. It is exceptionally luminous, radiating energy equivalent to approximately ten million Suns. This object is part of a binary system: If the pulsar is of an average size, then its companion is at least . On average, the pulsar rotates every 1.37 seconds, and revolves around its more massive companion every 2.5 days.

M82 X-2 is an ultraluminous X-ray source (ULX), shining about 100 times brighter than theory suggests something of its mass should be able to. Its brightness is many times higher than the Eddington limit, a basic physics guideline that sets an upper limit on the brightness that an object of a given mass should be able to achieve. Possible explanations for violations of the Eddington limit include geometrical effects arising from the funneling of in-falling material along magnetic field lines.

While M82 X-2 was previously known as an X-ray source, it was not until an observation campaign to study the newly discovered supernova SN 2014J in January 2014 that X-2's true nature was uncovered. Scientists looking at data from the NuSTAR spacecraft noticed a pulsing in the X-ray spectrum coming from near the supernova in Messier 82. Data from the Chandra and Swift spacecraft was used to verify the NuSTAR findings and provide the necessary spatial resolution to determine the exact source. After combining the NuSTAR and Chandra data, scientists were able to discern that M82 X-2 emitted both an X-ray beam and continuous broad X-ray radiation.

See also 

 M82 X-1

References

Bibliography 
 

X-ray pulsars
X-ray binaries
Ursa Major (constellation)
Unsolved problems in physics